Kevin John Nichols  (born 4 July 1955 in Grafton, New South Wales) is a former track cyclist and Olympic gold medallist.

His daughter, Kate Nichols, is a road racing cyclist.

Career
At the 1984 Summer Olympics, in Los Angeles, Nichols was a member of the gold winning pursuit team. Nichols also competed at the 1976 Summer Olympics and 1980 Summer Olympics.

Nichols won the Goulburn to Sydney Classic in 1993.

References

1955 births
Living people
Australian male cyclists
Australian track cyclists
Olympic cyclists of Australia
Cyclists at the 1976 Summer Olympics
Cyclists at the 1980 Summer Olympics
Cyclists at the 1984 Summer Olympics
Olympic gold medalists for Australia
Sportsmen from New South Wales
Olympic medalists in cycling
Recipients of the Medal of the Order of Australia
Medalists at the 1984 Summer Olympics
Commonwealth Games medallists in cycling
Commonwealth Games gold medallists for Australia
Commonwealth Games silver medallists for Australia
Cyclists at the 1974 British Commonwealth Games
Cyclists at the 1978 Commonwealth Games
Cyclists at the 1982 Commonwealth Games
Medallists at the 1974 British Commonwealth Games
Medallists at the 1978 Commonwealth Games
Medallists at the 1982 Commonwealth Games